Charles Woodward Stearns (September 24, 1817 – September 8, 1887) was an American physician and author.

Stearns, elder son of the Hon. Charles Stearns, of Springfield, Massachusetts, was born in that city, September 24, 1817. His mother, Julia Ann Woodward, was a grand-daughter of the Rev. Dr. Benjamin Trumbull, of North Haven, Connecticut.

Stearns graduated from Yale College in 1837.  After graduation, he studied for two years in the Medical School of Harvard College, but took his degree of M. D. at the Medical School of the University of Pennsylvania in 1840. He began practice in Springfield, but soon became a surgeon in the United States Army, and served in Florida and in New York Harbor in 1841–42. He then spent two years in Europe, and after his return resided mainly in Springfield and New York City, engaged in literary occupations as well as in the practice of his profession.  On the outbreak of the American Civil War, he enlisted as surgeon of the Third New York Infantry, and remained with that regiment until it was mustered out in May, 1863.  After this he relinquished the practice of medicine.

Following the war, he became "a northern teacher, missionary, and planter" in the South.  He wrote The black man of the South, and the Rebels: or, The characteristics of the former, and the recent outrages of the latter (1872)  He also published Shakespeare's Medical Knowledge (1865, 8vo, 78 pages), The Shakespeare Treasury of Wisdom and Knowledge (1869, 12mo, 436 pages), and A Concordance and Classified Index to the Constitution of the United States (1872, 8vo, 153 pages).

While spending some months in Williamstown, Mass, in 1884, he was stricken with paralysis, and remained an invalid for the rest of his life. He died in Longmeadow, Mass, September 8, 1887, at the age of 70.

Dr. Stearns married, June 23, 1853, Elizabeth Wolcott, of Springfield. After her death he married, July 2, 1862, Mary E., daughter of W. C. Shaw, of Baltimore, Md., who died in New York City, May 30, 1877.  He next married, April 23, 1879, Amanda Arkin, daughter of Judge Albro Arkin, of Duchess County, N. Y., who survived him. He left no children.

External links 

 Charles Woodward Stearns Papers. Manuscripts and Archives, Yale University Library.

References

1818 births
1887 deaths
19th-century American writers
American male non-fiction writers
American non-fiction writers
19th-century American male writers
Yale College alumni
Harvard Medical School alumni
Perelman School of Medicine at the University of Pennsylvania alumni